Hannah Shaw (born 22 September 1990) is a British basketball player for Sheffield Hatters and the Great Britain women's national basketball team .

She represented Great Britain at the FIBA Women's EuroBasket 2019.

References

External links

1990 births
Living people
British expatriate basketball people in Australia
British expatriate basketball people in Spain
British expatriate basketball people in the United States
British women's basketball players
Centers (basketball)
English women's basketball players
Miami Hurricanes women's basketball players
Sportspeople from Stockport
Basketball players at the 2018 Commonwealth Games
Commonwealth Games silver medallists for England
Commonwealth Games medallists in basketball
Medallists at the 2018 Commonwealth Games